Eleven Park is a proposed soccer-specific stadium to be constructed on the site of the former Diamond Chain Company facility in Indianapolis, Indiana, United States. It would be the home of Indy Eleven, a professional soccer team that plays in the USL Championship.

The stadium would be part of a mixed-use development including a hotel, offices, apartments, and a retail area, and is expected to be complete for the start of the 2025 USL Championship season.

History
The first proposal for an Indy Eleven stadium was in 2014, before the team had debuted. The plans called for a 18,500-seat stadium at the cost of $87 million. The plan was shelved in the state senate. In 2015 the proposal was revived, but rejected again in favor of renovating Michael A. Carroll Stadium, the home of the Eleven at the time. In 2017 the Eleven again attempted to receive stadium funding, but did not have a bill launched in favor of it.

The stadium would also have the potential to host concerts, women's soccer team, college and high school soccer, football, field hockey, rugby and lacrosse.

In February, the Senate Appropriations Committee approved the bill, with a requirement that the Eleven reach an agreement to join Major League Soccer before the stadium could be built. In April the bill passed the house with the MLS requirement removed. The bill would also pass the senate, and was signed by Governor Eric Holcomb in late April.

On January 8, 2021, Indy Eleven tweeted that they planned to announce the location of the new stadium by late March 2021.

On June 24, 2022, the club announced that the stadium would be built on the site of the former Diamond Chain Company factory in the southwest quadrant of downtown Indianapolis. The full price for the development along the White River is estimated to cost over $1 Billion. The project is anticipated to be completed in spring  2025.

References

External links
 
 Team website

Proposed stadiums in the United States
Soccer venues in Indiana
Sports venues in Indianapolis
USL Championship stadiums